Dark Messiah may refer to:

 Dark Messiah of Might and Magic, a 2006 video game
 Hellnight (video game) or Dark Messiah, a 1998 game
 Dark Messiah (comics), a fictional Marvel Comics character who once teamed with Ramrod
 Dark Messiah (novel), a science fiction novel by Martin Caidin.

See also 
 Armilus, in Jewish eschatology
 Antichrist, in Christian eschatology
 Masih ad-Dajjal, in Islamic eschatology
 False messiah